James Owen may refer to:

Politics
 James Owen (American politician) (1784–1865), U.S. Representative from North Carolina 1817–1819
 James Mason Owen (1903–1972), American mayor of Branson, Missouri, entrepreneur
 James Alexander Owen (1891–1955), American physician and politician from Mississippi

Sports
 Jimmy Owen (1864–?), English association footballer of the 1880s and 1890s for Port Vale and Stoke
 James Owen (footballer) (born 1991), Welsh footballer with Barrow
 Jim Owen, rugby league footballer of the 1920s for Great Britain, England, and St. Helens Recs

Other
 Jim Owen (singer-songwriter) (born 1941), American singer and songwriter
 James Owen (British author) (born 1969), British historian and journalist
 James A. Owen, American comic book creator, publisher and writer
 James E. Owen, British astrophysicist

See also
 James Owens (disambiguation)
 Jimmy Owens (disambiguation)